Dean Taylor may refer to:

Dean P. Taylor (1902–1977), American Congressman from New York
R. Dean Taylor (born 1939), Canadian singer-songwriter
Dean Taylor (baseball) (born 1951), Major League Baseball executive
Dean Taylor (musician) (late 20th century), American rock guitarist

See also
Deon Taylor (born 1976), American film director, producer and screenwriter
List of people with surname Taylor
Taylor (surname)